Stefan Melak (13 August 1946 – 10 April 2010) was a Polish activist and journalist. He was head of the Katyn Committee.

He died in the 2010 Polish Air Force Tu-154 crash near Smolensk on 10 April 2010. He was posthumously awarded the Order of Polonia Restituta.

References

1946 births
2010 deaths
Federation of Katyn Families
Polish journalists
Polish publishers (people)
Commanders of the Order of Polonia Restituta
Commanders with Star of the Order of Polonia Restituta
Recipients of the Silver Medal for Merit to Culture – Gloria Artis
Victims of the Smolensk air disaster